Morsink Icon Gallery (previously called Jan Morsink Ikonen) is an international gallery in Amsterdam specializing in Russian and Greek icons dating from the fifteenth to the nineteenth century. The collection presents the masterpieces of iconographic schools of Moscow, Novgorod, Pskov, Palech and the isle of Crete

History
Morsink Icon Gallery was established in 1977 as Jan Morsink Ikonen in Hengelo, Netherlands by Jan Morsink, who started the gallery out of interest for the art of the Orthodox world. After his death in 1992, his two sons, the art historian Simon Morsink and Hugo Morsink, who worked at that time as a real estate agent, continued the work of their father. They moved the gallery to Amsterdam and focused on an international clientele. At that time the gallery started participating in art fairs such as TEFAF Maastricht, TEFAF Basel, PAN Amsterdam, and Olympia London. In 2016 the name of the gallery was changed in Morsink Icon Gallery.

The gallery is located in  Amsterdam at Keizersgracht 454.

Exhibitions
2017
During Russian Art Week in London, 2014 Jan Morsink Iconen held an exhibition “Russian Icons: Spirit and Beauty” at Trinity House in Mayfair. The gallery presented 40 icons dating from the 15th to 19th centuries. The highlight of the exhibition was a 15-panel traveling iconostasis dating to 19th century, made by an Old Believers.

References

Tefaf: going Dutch has never felt better
Tefaf: going Dutch has never felt better--News-Artron.net

TEFAF Maastricht 2017 p. 296-297

Art galleries established in 1977
Art galleries in Amsterdam